Muraltia heisteria is a shrub in the milkwort family (Polygalaceae) which is native to South Africa and is cultivated in Australia. It was first described in 1753 by Carl Linnaeus.

Description
It is a very prickly, erect, sparsely-branched perennial shrub or dwarf shrub which is very rigid and densely branched. It contains hard, thick, spine-tipped, lance-shaped leaves which usually have hairy edges.

Taxonomy
It was first described by Carl Linnaeus as part of the Polygala genus in 1753. It was reclassified as a Muraltia in the 1760s. It is named after Lorenz Heister, a German surgeon and botanist.

Habitat and Ecology
The plant has been shown to naturally self-pollinate. It flowers between October and December in native areas, and between June and November in Australia. It serves as the host plant of the insect Pseudococcus muraltiae. According to the Red List of South African Plants, it is of least ecological concern and its population is stable.

Uses
The flowering twigs of the plant are used as an appetite stimulant in the local area and the plant is cultivated in Australia.

References

Polygalaceae